Stefano La Rosa (born 28 September 1985 in Grosseto) is an Italian long distance runner. He is a five-time Italian champion (twice over 10,000 metres and three times over 5000 metres).

Biography
Of Sicilian descent, as a junior athlete, he came 52nd at the 2003 IAAF World Cross Country Championships. He came 16th over 5000 metres at the 2004 World Junior Championships in Athletics, but managed a 1500 metres/5000 m double at the Italian junior championships. He won a team silver medal in the under-23 section of the 2006 European Cross Country Championships, courtesy of his tenth-place finish. He improved to fifth place in this category at the 2007 European race. Senior success came two years later in the form of a 5000 m silver medal at the 2009 Mediterranean Games in Pescara and a team bronze medal at the 2009 European Cross Country Championships alongside Daniele Meucci.

In his first major senior track final, he came tenth over 5000 m at the 2010 European Athletics Championships. He managed the same position in the 3000 m at the 2011 European Athletics Indoor Championships and secured the bronze medal over 5000 m at the 2011 Summer Universiade in Shenzhen. He was the first Italian finisher at the 2011 BOClassic 10K race, taking sixth place overall.

Achievements

National titles
He has won 9 times the individual national championship.
5 wins in the 5000 metres (2009, 2010, 2011, 2012, 2013)
3 wins in the 10,000 metres (2008, 2009, 2018)
1 win in the Half marathon (2012)

References

External links
 

1985 births
Living people
Athletics competitors of Centro Sportivo Carabinieri
Italian male cross country runners
Italian male long-distance runners
Universiade medalists in athletics (track and field)
People from Grosseto
Mediterranean Games silver medalists for Italy
Mediterranean Games medalists in athletics
Athletes (track and field) at the 2009 Mediterranean Games
Athletes (track and field) at the 2013 Mediterranean Games
Universiade bronze medalists for Italy
Competitors at the 2013 Summer Universiade
Medalists at the 2011 Summer Universiade
Sportspeople from the Province of Grosseto